Upper Breakish is a village on the Isle of Skye in Scotland in the United Kingdom.

References

Populated places in the Isle of Skye